Daniel Tarczal (born 22 March 1985) is a professionaI Czech footballer.

References
 Profile at iDNES.cz
 Guardian Football

Czech footballers
1985 births
Living people
People from Beroun
Czech First League players
1. FK Příbram players
Association football midfielders
Sportspeople from the Central Bohemian Region